Peter Frechette (born October 3, 1956) is an American actor. He is a stage actor with two Tony Award nominations for Eastern Standard and Our Country's Good, and frequently stars in the plays of Richard Greenberg. He is well known on TV for playing hacker George on the NBC series Profiler and Peter Montefiore on Thirtysomething. In film, he is known for playing T-Bird Louis DiMucci in the musical Grease 2.

Early life
Raised in Coventry, Rhode Island, Frechette is the youngest of five children. His father was an efficiency expert and his mother a nurse. Frechette earned a Bachelor of Fine Arts in Theater from the University of Rhode Island.

Theater

Frechette first appeared on the professional stage at the Edinburgh Festival Fringe as part of the Rhode Island Summer Ensemble, starring with Chel Chenier in the comedy Pontifications on Puberty and Pigtails in 1979.

He received high praise in 1981 for his work in two different productions of Harry Ruby's Songs My Mother Never Sang. The same year he starred in the one-act Off-Broadway production of In Cahoots, part of the Three Hopefuls MARATHON (featuring two other one-act productions). He left to work in Los Angeles, but returned in 1984 to star in Bob Merrill's Musical We're Home, and again in 1987's revised production of Flora the Red Menace (he also recorded songs for the cast album).

In 1988, he returned to live in New York City to take the lead role of Drew Paley in the Off-Broadway production of Eastern Standard by Richard Greenberg, costarring Patricia Clarkson, Dylan Baker, and Kevin Conroy. The show transferred to Broadway in December 1989 and he remained in the cast throughout the run despite filming the television series Dream Street simultaneously in New Jersey (he filmed every day and performed every night for three months).

Frechette earned the Drama Desk Award, Outer Critics Circle Award and Theatre World Award for best actor, and was nominated for a Tony Award. The same year, he starred in The American Place Theatre's Off-Broadway production of Hyde in Hollywood (he would return to the role of communist screenwriter Jake Singer for a television version of the play two years later).

In 1991, he starred opposite Cherry Jones in Our Country's Good, which resulted in a second Tony nomination for best actor. The same year he co-starred in Absent Friends as grief-stricken Colin. In 1992, he appeared in Bob Merrill's last Broadway musical (and cast recording) of Hannah...1939 and Larry Kramer's autobiographical The Destiny of Me. He also appeared on Broadway in the original productions of Any Given Day (1993) and The Play's the Thing (1995), as well as the 2005 revival of The Odd Couple as Roy (and understudy for Matthew Broderick's Felix Unger).

He's appeared at the Roundabout Theatre in three productions: The Play's the Thing (1995), Hurrah at Last (1999) and The Dazzle (2002). For The Dazzle, he and Reg Rogers were both nominated for Drama League Award for Distinguished Performance and Lucille Lortel Award for Best Actor (Rogers won); the two shared the Obie Award for best actor for their performances as the co-dependent Collier Brothers. They originated the show in 2000 at the New York Stage and Film at Vassar College's Powerhouse Theater.

Frechette was part of the west to east coast transfer of Hurrah at Last, in the role of Laurie. He earned the Backstage West Garland Award in 1998 for his performance produced by the South Coast Repertory. He also appeared in their productions of Night and Her Stars and The Extra Man. In 2016, he returned to the theater company in the role of Joseph II in Amadeus.

Frechette was a member of the resident ensemble at the Oregon Shakespeare Festival for five years (2011–15). He has also worked with national regional companies including the Seattle Repertory Theatre, Berkeley Repertory Theatre, George Street Playhouse, Cape Playhouse,  The Old Globe, La Jolla Playhouse, Mark Taper Forum, Berkshire Playhouse, and the Pasadena Playhouse as an actor and instructor since leaving New York City.

Frechette is a founding member of the New York theater company The Drama Department (along with David Warren, Cynthia Nixon, Patricia Clarkson, Hope Davis, John Slattery, Michael Rosenberg and John Cameron Mitchell).

Film & Television
Frechette's made his film debut in Grease 2 (1982) as T-Bird Louis DiMucci. He appeared on the film's soundtrack (including a solo version of 'Let's Do It For Our Country', a satirical duet ballad he performed with Maureen Teefy in the film). He went on to appear in the pilot of Voyagers! (as Eddie Rickenbacker).

He appeared in two episodes of The Facts of Life which served as backdoor pilots for a series about an all-boys military academy. The would-be series would have starred Jimmy Baio with Frechette as the primary antagonist, but it was not picked up to series. He continued appearing in films, mostly horror films including The Hills Have Eyes Part II (1984), The Kindred (1987), The Unholy (1988) and Paint it Black (1989).

He had a large role in the 1984 comedy No Small Affair as Jon Cryer's older brother. He made guest appearances on Taxi, The Renegades, Hill Street Blues, Hotel, It's a Living, Cagney & Lacey, Matlock, and, most notably, in two episodes of L.A. Law as Christopher Appleton, an HIV-positive gay man who claimed to have killed his lover as an act of mercy because he was dying from AIDS.

Frechette was cast as one of the three leads of 1989's Dream Street, the unofficial blue-collar spin-off of Thirtysomething (it lasted 6 episodes, airing as a mid-season replacement). In November 1989, Frechette guest-starred in the Thirtysomething episode "Strangers" (season 3, episode 6), as Peter Montefiore, a man who goes on a date with recurring character Russell Weller (David Marshall Grant). Frechette and Weller appeared in bed, seemingly naked after having had sexual relations following a first date, generating controversy. A number of advertisers refused to run commercials during the broadcast, and ABC opted not to air the episode again during summer reruns (it has since returned to the syndication schedule and was released in the season three DVD box set).

Frechette was nominated for the Emmy Award for Outstanding Guest Actor in a Drama Series for his performance. He returned for three more episodes of Thirtysomething in season 4, a small appearance in "The Haunting of DAA" and as part of the inner-circle of friends in the episodes "New Year's Eve" and "Closing the Circle".

The same year he appeared in the first season of Law & Order as Jack Curry in 'The Reaper's Helper", an HIV positive man committing "mercy killings" for others diagnosed with AIDS. He would appear in two more episodes of Law & Order (and one episode of Law & Order: Criminal Intent). In 1992, he had a recurring role in the first season of Picket Fences.

In 1993. he co-starred in the critically acclaimed Barbarians at the Gate. The following year, he starred in the Lifetime film Against Her Will: The Carrie Buck Story. In 1996 he appeared in the pilot for the NBC series Profiler as computer expert/hacker George Fraley. Between shooting the pilot and being picked up, the producers made his character a regular and would remain on the show throughout the entire run.

In 2006, he took on the substantial role of bank manager Peter Hammond in Spike Lee's heist film Inside Man. He also appeared in small roles in various films, including The First Wives Club and Miracle at St. Anna. In 2016, he appeared as a high-powered divorce attorney on the television series Devious Maids.

Personal life
Frechette's partner since 1988 is director David Warren. They married in 2017.

Filmography

Film

Television

Theatre credits

References

External links

1956 births
Living people
Male actors from Rhode Island
American male stage actors
American male television actors
American male film actors
American gay actors
Drama Desk Award winners
People from Warwick, Rhode Island
LGBT people from Rhode Island
University of Rhode Island alumni